Orbital plate may refer to:
 Orbital part of frontal bone
 Orbital lamina of ethmoid bone